Ocellularia kansriae is a species of corticolous (bark-dwelling) lichen in the family Graphidaceae. Found in Northern and Eastern Thailand, it was formally described as a new species in 2002 by lichenologists Natsurang Homchantara and Brian J. Coppins. The lichen has a shiny, olivaceous-grey thallus with a texture ranging from smooth to finely verruculose (warted). It contains protocetraric acid, a secondary compound. The specific epithet kansriae honours Thai lichenologist Kansri Boonpragob, a colleague who collected specimens from Khao Yai National Park in Eastern Thailand.

References

kansriae
Lichen species
Lichens described in 2002
Lichens of Thailand
Taxa named by Brian John Coppins
Taxa named by Natsurang Homchantara